WIBU (1440 AM) is a radio station broadcasting a news/talk format. Licensed to Paris, Illinois, United States, the station serves the Terre Haute, Indiana area. The station is currently owned by Midwest Communications, Inc. and features programming from Jones Radio Network.

The station broadcasts local news during the morning, with some talk and local sports programming as well.

References

External links

IBU
News and talk radio stations in the United States
Midwest Communications radio stations
Radio stations established in 1951
1951 establishments in Illinois